The Georgia Resolutions of 1827 were a response to the Cherokee’s refusal to cede their territory within the U.S. state of Georgia. The resolutions declared the state's right to title, jurisdiction, and authority over all the land within its borders. They also stipulated that Indigenous people were tenants of Georgia at the state's will, and Georgia reserved the right to coerce obedience from all of its tenants, white, red or black. The resolutions were intended to pressure the federal government to prioritize its responsibility to Georgia over its responsibility to the Cherokee Nation, although it did not achieve its desired effect until the Jackson administration came into power.

See also
Cherokee removal
Georgia Land Lotteries
1805 Land Lottery
1807 Land Lottery
1820 Land Lottery
1821 Land Lottery
1827 Land Lottery
1832 Land Lottery
Gold Lottery of 1832
1833 Fractions Lottery
Trail of Tears

References

United States and Native American treaties
Legal history of Georgia (U.S. state)
1827 in Georgia (U.S. state)